Ro'i is an Israeli settlement organized as a moshav in the West Bank. Located in the Jordan Valley, it falls under the jurisdiction of Bik'at HaYarden Regional Council.

The international community considers Israeli settlements in the West Bank illegal under international law, but the Israeli government disputes this.

History
The village was established in September 1976 as a Nahal settlement, and was converted to a civilian moshav two years later. Its name is an acronym for Ramat Uzi Yairi, a former commander of the IDF's Paratroopers Brigade who was killed in the Savoy Operation in 1975. Ro'i in Hebrew also means "my shepherd" , a given description of God, as in Psalm 23 "the Lord is my shepherd".

References

Moshavim
Israeli settlements in the West Bank
Nahal settlements
Agricultural Union
Populated places established in 1976
1976 establishments in the Israeli Military Governorate